Mary Holt (31 July 1924 – 17 February 2021) was a British Conservative politician and judge.

Early life 
Holt was born in July 1924. She gained her degree, an MA LLB with honours, from Girton College, Cambridge.

Career 
Holt was Member of Parliament (MP) for Preston North from 1970 to 1974, when she lost the seat in the February election of that year to Labour's Ronald Atkins (from whom she had won the seat in 1970). She was the first woman to hold the Preston North seat. In Parliament, she was an advocate for the Domicile and Matrimonial Proceedings Act 1973, which allowed wives to have different addresses to their husbands. Her attempt to regain the seat in the October 1974 election was unsuccessful. From 1977 to 1995, Holt was a circuit court judge.

Personal life 
Holt never married. She died in Fulwood, Preston in February 2021 at the age of 96, weeks after the death of her predecessor (and successor) Ronald Atkins at 104.

References

External links 
 

1924 births
2021 deaths
20th-century British women politicians
Alumni of Girton College, Cambridge
British women judges
Conservative Party (UK) MPs for English constituencies
Female members of the Parliament of the United Kingdom for English constituencies
Members of the Parliament of the United Kingdom for constituencies in Lancashire
Politics of Preston
UK MPs 1970–1974
Place of birth missing
20th-century English women
20th-century English people